The New Synagogue was the largest synagogue in Breslau, Germany (now Wrocław, Poland). It was one of the largest synagogues in the German Empire and a centre of Reform Judaism in Breslau. It was built in 1865–1872, and designed by Edwin Oppler. It was burnt down during the Kristallnacht pogrom which swept across Nazi Germany on 9–10 November 1938.

History
Manuel Joël, who had become the rabbi for the Reform Jewish community in 1863, was the first rabbi to head the community in the new building. He died in 1890, and was followed by Jacob Guttman, who served until his death in 1919.  Dr. Hermann Vogelstein became the rabbi in 1920. On November 4, 1938, there was a farewell service for him, and a welcome service for Dr.  Reinhold Lewin, who would  be the last rabbi.

References

External links

 New Synagogue in Breslau: A Digital Reconstruction at Hochschule Mainz University of Applied Sciences
 The Walls of the Confessions: Neo-Romanesque Architecture, Nationalism, and Religious Identity in the Kaiserreich 2004 PhD dissertation with extensive discussion of the synagogue

Synagogues destroyed during Kristallnacht (Germany)
Former Reform synagogues in Poland
Gothic Revival synagogues
Synagogues in Wrocław